There have been six Formula One drivers from Mexico who have taken part in races since the championship began in 1950. Sergio Pérez is the most successful, having won  Grands Prix. Since , Pérez drives for the Red Bull team.

Pole winner
Pérez is the only Mexican F1 driver to achieve a pole position. He took his first pole position at the 2022 Saudi Arabian Grand Prix, in his 219th Grand Prix meeting (a record for the most Grands Prix before a pole).

Race winners
Pedro Rodríguez and Pérez are the only Mexican drivers to have won an F1 race, with two wins for Rodríguez and  wins for Pérez.

Current drivers
Pérez continued to race with Force India till their collapse in 2018.

Former drivers
Brothers Pedro and Ricardo Rodríguez raced in the 1960s. Héctor Rebaque raced in the 1970s. Moisés Solana attended races in the United States and Mexico throughout the 1960s.

Timeline

Summary of results 

*Current driver

See also
List of Formula One Grand Prix winners

References